Barry Kingham Oakley (born 24 February 1931) is an Australian writer.

Biography
Born in Melbourne, Oakley was educated at Christian Brothers College, St Kilda, and the University of Melbourne. He was a secondary school teacher in Victoria from 1955 to 1962, and also lectured in humanities at RMIT University in 1963. He worked as an advertising copywriter and for the Department of Overseas Trade before his first novel, A Wild Ass of a Man, was published in 1967. He was joint winner of the Captain Cook Bicentenary Literary Award for his 1971 novel Let's Hear it for Prendergast. His early plays were performed at La Mama Theatre in Carlton.

From 1988 to 1997, Oakley was literary editor of The Australian newspaper.

Plays
From the Desk of Eugene Flockhart (1966)
Witzenhausen, Where Are You? (1968)
A Lesson in English (1976)
It's a Chocolate World
Cullity on Furniture
The Feet of Daniel Mannix
Beware of Imitations
Bedfellows (1975)
The Ship's Whistle (1978)
Marsupials (1979)
Scanlan (1980)
Beware of Imitations (1985)
Music (2012)

Novels
A Wild Ass of a Man (1967)
A Salute to the Great McCarthy (1970) – filmed as The Great Macarthy (1975)
Let's Hear it for Prendergast (1971)
Craziplane (1989)
Don't Leave Me (2002)

Non-fiction
 Minitudes: Diaries 1974-1997 (2000)

References

External links

1931 births
Living people
20th-century Australian novelists
21st-century Australian novelists
20th-century Australian dramatists and playwrights
21st-century Australian dramatists and playwrights
20th-century Australian male writers
21st-century Australian male writers
Journalists from Victoria (Australia)
Australian male dramatists and playwrights
Australian male novelists
Australian diarists
Writers from Melbourne
University of Melbourne alumni
Academic staff of RMIT University
20th-century Australian public servants
People educated at St Mary's College, Melbourne